Inuvik/Shell Lake Water Aerodrome  is located  south-southeast of Inuvik, Northwest Territories, Canada and is open from June until September.

The airport is classified as an airport of entry by Nav Canada and is staffed by the Canada Border Services Agency (CBSA). CBSA officers at this airport can handle only general aviation aircraft with floats, with no more than 15 passengers.

Transportation

The aerodrome is accessed by Dempster Highway.

See also
Inuvik (Mike Zubko) Airport

References

Airports in the Arctic
Registered aerodromes in the Inuvik Region
Seaplane bases in the Northwest Territories
Inuvik